Fumio (written: , , , , , , ,  or  in katakana) is a masculine Japanese given name. Notable people with the name include:

, Japanese illustrator
, Japanese politician
, Japanese ski jumping sports official
, Japanese sculptor
, Japanese karateka
, Japanese baseball player
, Japanese politician
, Japanese composer
, Japanese economist
, Japanese physician
, Japanese manga artist and character designer
, Japanese figure skater
, Japanese racewalker
, Japanese microbiologist
, Japanese jazz pianist and composer
, Japanese motorcycle racer
, Japanese politician
, Japanese hammer thrower
, Japanese film director
, Japanese jazz pianist
, Japanese politician, current Prime Minister of Japan
, Japanese storyboard artist and anime director
, Japanese politician
, Japanese art director
, Japanese jazz trumpeter
, Japanese writer
, Japanese rally driver
, Japanese chief executive
, Japanese sport shooter
, Japanese basketball player
, Japanese judoka
Fumio Toyoda (1947–2001), Japanese aikidoka
, Japanese lawyer, politician and activist
Fumio Usami (born 1968), Japanese mixed martial artist
, Japanese actor
, Japanese audio engineer

Japanese masculine given names